Pool A (Santo Domingo) of the 2019 Fed Cup Americas Group II was one of three pools in the Americas Group II of the 2019 Fed Cup. Five teams competed in a round robin competition, with the top team winning advancement to Group I.

Standings 

Standings are determined by: 1. number of wins; 2. number of matches; 3. in two-team ties, head-to-head records; 4. in three-team ties, (a) percentage of sets won (head-to-head records if two teams remain tied), then (b) percentage of games won (head-to-head records if two teams remain tied), then (c) Fed Cup rankings.

Round-robin

Venezuela vs. Uruguay

Guatemala vs. Dominican Republic

Guatemala vs. Cuba

Dominican Republic vs. Uruguay

Venezuela vs. Dominican Republic

Cuba vs. Uruguay

Venezuela vs. Cuba

Guatemala vs. Uruguay

Venezuela vs. Guatemala

Cuba vs. Dominican Republic

See also
Fed Cup structure

References

External links
 Fed Cup website

2019 Fed Cup Americas Zone